Anuraga Aralithu is a 1986 Indian Kannada-language film directed by M. S. Rajashekar. It is based on the Kannada novel Anuragada Anthahpura written by H. G. Radhadevi. The film was produced by M. S. Puttaswamy. The film stars Rajkumar, Madhavi and Geetha. The film's score and soundtrack was composed by Upendra Kumar to the lyrics of Chi. Udayashankar who also wrote the screenplay.

The film was highly successful at the box office with a theatrical run of about 50 weeks. It was later remade in seven other languages – in Telugu in 1992 as Gharana Mogudu, in Tamil in 1992 as Mannan,  in Hindi in 1994 as Laadla, in Sinhala in 1996 as Mal Hathai, in Odia in 1998 as Sindura Nuhein Khela Ghara, in Bengali in 2001 as Jamaibabu Jindabad and in Bangladesh in 2002 as Shami Strir Juddho.

This was the first Kannada movie to be remade in Bengali, Odia, Bangladeshi Bengali and Sinhala. This was also the first Kannada movie to be remade in two foreign languages. With the remakes of this movie, Rajkumar became the first Indian actor whose movies were remade more than 50 times and also the first Indian actor whose movies were remade in nine other languages. This was the first Indian movie to be remade in seven other languages.

Plot 
The film begins with Ashadevi being announced as the leading industrialist in India. Ashadevi is a rich and arrogant lady and rules her company with an iron hand. Enters Shankar, who is a kind-hearted man who works as a Chief Mechanic in Bombay. Shankar learns that his mother is suffering from paralysis. Shankar quits his job in Bombay and decides to stay in Nanjangud to take care of his ailing mother. His family friend Papanna recommends him to meet a renowned businessman for his job. Shankar goes to meet the businessman and on the way, an elderly man, Mohan Rao, is beaten up by several men because his daughter dismissed them from the job. Shankar saves him and takes him to a hospital and finds out that Mohan Rao is none other the businessman whom he was going to meet. After a few days, Shankar comes to Mohan Rao's house to see him and Mohan Rao asks Shankar to ask something as a gift. At the same time, he shows the letter of Papanna. Thus, Mohan Rao provides a job for Shankar in his company. But Ashadevi was not happy with her father's decision and tries many pranks to remove Shankar from the job.

Shankar befriends Uma, who is Ashadevi's secretary. Uma is a very sweet and warm person who instantly falls in love with Shankar. But she hides her love towards Shankar. One day, Shankar learns of problems (no drinking water supply in nearest location) suffered by employee's families. Shankar asks Ashadevi to solve this problem, but initially she refuses, but later she accepts because Shankar saved lakhs of rupees in finding out the duplicate dispatched stocks. One day, Ashadevi's Company manager behaved rudely with employees with bad words. At the same time, Shankar supported the employees and demands the manager to apologize the workers. Ashadevi comes to the spot and dismisses Shankar from the job. While going back, Shankar sees Ashadevi walking towards a molten iron furnace and saves her from an accident. But she slaps him for hugging her. Later, Shankar goes to her chamber and slaps her in the same manner and says "Goodbye". Ashadevi on the spot, decides to marry Shankar, but only to avenge in return. She asks his father to marry her to Shankar. Mohan Rao asks Shankar to marry his daughter, but he refuses. Later, he is forced by his mother to marry her. Uma feels very sad after this as she was to reveal her love and marry Shankar.

Ashadevi expects Shankar to remain at home after marriage, but her plan backfires as Shankar continues as an employee even after marriage. Ashadevi faces failure trying many ways to take revenge against Shankar. Ashadevi refuses to announce bonuses to workers in her company, which agitates all workers including Shankar and redirects them to an indefinite hunger strike, including Shankar. Mohan Rao realizes that his company's image is at stake and takes over as the chairman. Ashadevi is angered by this move, thinking that she has lost to Shankar. After the strike, While Shankar is eating his first gulp, Ashadevi starts humiliating Shankar in front of his mother without knowing her presence. Shankar's mother learns of their bitter relationship and dies immediately, out of guilt. With full of guilt Ashadevi attempts suicide shooting herself with revolver, Uma and Mohan Rao try to stop her, but she ends up getting the bullet in her belly. She was taken to hospital and hence she was cured. At same time Uma rushes in search of Shankar and she adjures him to forgive Ashadevi. Shankar comes to the hospital to see Ashadevi. Ashadevi asks forgiveness for her mistake.

Cast
 Rajkumar as Shankar
 Madhavi as Ashadevi (voice dubbed by B. Jayashree) 
 Geetha as Uma 
 Pandari Bai
 K. S. Ashwath
 Thoogudeepa Srinivas
 Shringar Nagaraj
 Sadashiva Brahmavar as General Manager Lakshmanaraya
 Parvathavani
 Kunigal Ramanath
 Shivaprakash
 Ashwath Narayan

Remakes
The movie was remade in seven languages.

Soundtrack

Upendra Kumar composed the background score for the film and the soundtracks. Lyrics for the soundtracks were penned by Chi. Udaya Shankar. The album consists of five soundtracks.

References

External links 
 

1980s Kannada-language films
1986 drama films
1986 films
Films based on Indian novels
Films directed by M. S. Rajashekar
Films with screenplays by Chi. Udayashankar
Indian drama films
Kannada films remade in other languages